Following is a list of senators of Indre-et-Loire, people who have represented the department of Indre-et-Loire in the Senate of France.

Third Republic

Senators for Indre-et-Loire under the French Third Republic were:

 Georges Houssard (1876–1879)
 Arthur de Quinemont (1876–1879)
 Hugues Fournier (1879–1888)
 Charles Guinot (1879–1893)
 Pierre Nioche (1888–1902)
 Antoine-Dieudonné Belle (1894–1915)
 Charles Bidault (1897–1917)
 Eugène Pic-Paris (1902–1917)
 Octave Foucher (1920–1933)
 Alphonse Chautemps (1920–1940)
 René Besnard (1920–1940)
 Paul Germain (1934–1940)

Fourth Republic

Senators for Indre-et-Loire under the French Fourth Republic were:

 Henri Buffet (1946–1948)
 Paul Racault (1946–1948)
 Michel Debré (1948–1958)
 Joseph Leccia (1948–1955)
 Edmond Jollit (1955–1959)

Fifth Republic 
Senators for Indre-et-Loire under the French Fifth Republic:

 Marc Desaché (1959–1965)
 Jacques Vassor (1959–1974)
 Marcel Fortier (1965–1992)
 Raymond Villatte (1974–1975)
 Roger Moreau (1975–1983)
 André-Georges Voisin (1983–1992)
 Jean Delaneau (1983–2001)
 James Bordas (1992–2001)
 Dominique Leclerc (1992–2011)
 Yves Dauge (2001–2011)
 Marie-France Beaufils (2001–2017)
 Jean-Jacques Filleul (2011–2017)
 Jean Germain (2011–2015)
 Stéphanie Riocreux (2015–2017)
 Serge Babary from 2017 
 Pierre Louault from 2017 
 Isabelle Raimond-Pavero from 2017

References

Sources

 
Lists of members of the Senate (France) by department